Outingdale (formerly, Mars and Outingdale Resort) is an unincorporated community in El Dorado County, California.

References

Unincorporated communities in California
Unincorporated communities in El Dorado County, California